Merseytravel is the passenger transport executive, responsible for the coordination of public transport in the Liverpool City Region in North West England. Merseytravel was established on 1 December 1969 as the Merseyside Passenger Transport Executive. From 1 April 2014, with the creation of the Liverpool City Region, Merseytravel expanded its area of operation from the metropolitan county of Merseyside to also include the Borough of Halton.

Governance

The Merseyside Passenger Transport Authority and Merseyside Passenger Transport Executive were established as a result of the Transport Act 1968. The authority, which was responsible for transport strategy and policy, included representatives from 18 different councils. 
The executive was responsible for day-to-day operation of transport services.
In 1974, when the transport organisation's boundaries were made co-extensive with the new metropolitan county of Merseyside which was formally created by the Local Government Act 1972, the authority was composed of 23 councillors of the new Merseyside County Council.

When the metropolitan county councils were abolished by the Local Government Act 1985, new structures had to be created. A new joint board - again called The Merseyside Passenger Transport Authority - was created. It was later renamed the Merseyside Integrated Transport Authority and composed 18 councillors assembled from Merseyside's five districts: Liverpool, Knowsley, St Helens, Sefton and Wirral.
On 1 April 2014, the Merseyside Integrated Transport Authority was abolished and reformed as the Merseytravel Committee of Liverpool City Region Combined Authority. The transport authority area is extended to include the whole of the Liverpool City Region, which comprises Merseyside and the Borough of Halton.

In May 2021, mayor Steve Rotherham set out a plan for all trains, buses and ferries to become an integrated transport system under Merseytravel, owned by the Liverpool City Region Combined Authority.

Rail services

Merseyrail Northern and Wirral lines
As a result of the privatisation of British Rail, the Northern and Wirral lines of the local Merseyrail rail network were brought together as the Mersey Rail Electrics passenger franchise, that was privatised on 19 January 1997. Under the original privatisation legislation of 1993, PTEs were co-signatories of franchise agreements covering their areas. The first train operating company (TOC) awarded the franchise contract was MTL, originally the operating arm of the PTE, but privatised itself in 1985. It traded under the Merseyrail Electrics brand, but after MTL was sold to Arriva, the company was rebranded Arriva Trains Merseyside from 27 April 2001.

When the franchise came up for renewal, reflecting the exclusive nature of the two lines - being largely isolated from the rest of the National Rail network and with no through passenger services to/from outside the Merseyrail network, the decision was taken to remove it from the national framework and bring it into local control. As a result, using the Merseyrail Electrics Network Order 2002 the Secretary of State for Transport exempted the system from being designated as a railway franchise under the privatisation legislation (the Railways Act 1993). This allowed the PTE to contract out the lines themselves, which it did with Merseyrail operated by Serco-Abellio commencing a 25-year contract on 20 July 2003.

Unlike most rolling stock that is owned by private sector rolling stock companies, Merseytravel will outright own the Class 777 fleet, operated by Merseyrail. The current Class 507 and Class 508 fleets are owned by Angel Trains and leased to Merseyrail.

Merseytravel City line
A third line, the City line, also historically branded as Merseyrail under British Rail, was also privatised under the 1993 Act, but as part of the much larger North West Regional Railways (NWRR) franchise. On 2 March 1997, North Western Trains, later rebranded First North Western, commenced operating the franchise. Some Class 142 units were repainted in Merseytravel's yellow livery. This line was not included in the 2003 exemption given to the other two lines, and so it has continued as part of the government-administered rail franchise system, although the role of PTEs in the franchising process has altered due by the 2005 Railways Act. From 11 December 2004, the NWRR franchise was merged into a new Northern franchise and operated by Northern Rail. The Merseyrail Class 142 units were repainted into Northern Rail livery. On 1 April 2016, the franchise was taken over by Arriva Rail North.

Bus services

Prior to the Transport Act 1985, which nationally mandated the deregulation and privatisation of bus services in 1986 throughout England except Greater London, it operated a large proportion of the bus services on Merseyside, under the Merseyside Transport brand. It had taken over the municipally provided bus operations of Liverpool, Birkenhead and Wallasey county borough corporations in 1970, and expanded to cover the county borough municipal corporation areas and bus services of St Helens and Southport in 1974. The PTE also extensively co-ordinated and joint operated bus services on Merseyside with National Bus Company subsidiaries Crosville and Ribble. These were both longer distance services coming into Merseyside from Cheshire and Lancashire along with Crosville and Ribble services operated in Sefton, Liverpool and the Wirral only. The PTE also had significant involvement in the operation of Crosville and Ribble garages on Merseyside too. Similar arrangements also existed with Lancashire United Transport/Greater Manchester Transport and Warrington Borough Transport from services connecting Merseyside with Cheshire, Greater Manchester and Lancashire.

After deregulation, the Merseyside Transport operations were branded as Merseybus, and were subsequently privatised as MTL. The previous co-ordination of Merseyside's bus network disappeared as Crosville, Ribble now known as North Western and Greater Manchester's GM Buses became competitors of
Merseybus along with new entrants like CMT Buses, Fareway, Halton Transport, Liverbus, Liverlne, PMT's Red Rider, Village Group, and other smaller operators. Merseyside's popular bus corridors became a hot-bed of intense competition with less lucrative services ignored and in some cases disappearing. Ultimately things settled down in the mid-1990s with Merseybus parent company MTL took over a number of the new entrants, some disappearing and North Western now owned by Arriva the remainder. In 2000 MTL was bought by Arriva and is now part of an enlarged Arriva North West. However Arriva was required by the Monopolies & Mergers Commission to divest some of its Liverpool operations; which are now operated by Stagecoach Merseyside & South Lancashire. There are also smaller Merseyside operators like Cumfybus and HTL Buses.

Today, Merseytravel is also responsible for providing bus services which are considered socially necessary but are not profitable, these are operated by other operators, using a best value tendering system. Fares are presently subsidised at levels lower than local commercial services.

Ferries and tunnels

Merseytravel owns and operates the Mersey Ferry service between Liverpool Pier Head, Seacombe in Wallasey and Woodside in Birkenhead. The fleet consists of two vessels: Royal Iris of the Mersey and Snowdrop.

There are three transport tunnels under the River Mersey. The passenger transport executive is responsible for the two road vehicular tunnels under the River Mersey, one connecting Birkenhead to Liverpool city centre, the other, Wallasey, to the centre of Liverpool, and consequently it controls the Mersey Tunnels Police. The tunnel to, and from, Birkenhead is the Queensway Tunnel, and the Wallasey, the Kingsway Tunnel. Merseyrail also runs through a railway tunnel under the river connecting central Liverpool and Birkenhead, which was the first transport tunnel under the Mersey to be built, in the nineteenth century.

Non-transport ventures

Merseytravel, through Mersey Ferries, owns the Liverpool tourist attraction The Beatles Story, a museum dedicated to The Beatles located on Royal Albert Dock.

Future projects
Neil Scales, the former chief executive and director general of Merseytravel, in his 2011 presentation "Growing the Railways on Merseyside", outlined future projects that Merseytravel may be involved in:
 Electrification of Kirkby - Headbolt Lane, Bidston - Wrexham sections
 St Helens Junction, and Bootle - Aintree branch
 Further electrification between Hunts Cross - Warrington - Manchester, Headbolt Lane - Wigan and Ormskirk - Preston
 Liverpool F.C. football stadium access from the Bootle branch
 Re-investment in the Burscough Curves, linking Southport to Ormskirk and Preston
 Third rail electrification between Helsby and Ellesmere Port, (see Ellesmere Port to Warrington Line)

Merseytravel have also stated their support to linking Liverpool to the High Speed 2 network with a directly connected, brand new, twin-track line.

In September 2017, a report was compiled into the reopening of Liverpool St James railway station which concluded that the reopening of the station would be highly beneficial.

Liverpool City Region Combined Authority announced in August 2019 that they were planning on using £172million of funding on several major transport projects. These included:
 A new railway station at Headbolt Lane, Kirkby
 Re-opening St James railway station, Liverpool
 Purchasing two low carbon Mersey ferries to replace the current aging fleet

Ticketing
Merseytravel are responsible for the management of local, reduced cost, integrated ticketing systems, and as part of this issue the ITSO-compatible MetroCard smartcard, on to which certain local travel passes are loaded. They are also the body responsible in the Liverpool City Region for providing and funding concessionary travel for the elderly and disabled, through the English National Concessionary Bus Travel Scheme. For those not at the present Pension age, but over the former applicable ages of 60 and 65, for men and women respectively, Merseytravel are funded to operate a localised version of the scheme.

Area system

For ticketing purposes, Merseyside, hitherto, has historically been divided into four areas:
 Area A: St Helens, Knowsley
 Area B: Wirral
 Area C: Liverpool, south Sefton (Bootle, Crosby and Maghull), Knowsley
 Area D: north Sefton (Southport and Formby)

Out of current city region combined area:
 Area E: (None Existing since January 2008) Crossover Wirral and Liverpool
 Area F: Ormskirk
 Area G: Chester, Ellesmere Port

Each area is further subdivided into zones. There is considerable overlap of area A and C, with all parts of Knowsley lying in area A also being covered by area C. This region is designated as zone A3/C2/C3.

Two rail-only areas exist, for stations covered by Merseyrail outside the current Liverpool City Region. Area F covers the Northern line from Maghull to Ormskirk, whilst Area G covers the section of the Wirral line from Hooton to Ellesmere Port and Chester.

Until January 2008, a "cross-Mersey" area E existed, which covered the central areas of Liverpool and Birkenhead, as well as the ferry terminal at Seacombe.
Tickets were commonly issued for areas B and E covering the whole of Wirral together with Liverpool city centre. Birkenhead railway stations covered by area E were:
 Hamilton Square
 Conway Park
 Birkenhead Park
 Birkenhead North
 Birkenhead Central
 Green Lane

See also
 Liverpool Tramways Company
 Merseytram
 Wirral Street Car

References

External links
 

Companies owned by municipalities of England
Public transport executives in the United Kingdom
Transport in Liverpool
Transport in Merseyside
Transport companies established in 1969
1969 establishments in England